The 2018-19 Bayamón FC season, was the nineteenth season since the club's formation.

Overview
In January 2018, Marco Vélez was appointed Head Coach following the exit of Delfin Ferreres. Bayamón FC finished runners-up in their preseason Bayamón Cup.

In March 2018, Bayamón FC began playing in the first Puerto Rican Football Federation Preparatory Tournament. They are currently first place and already secured their spot into the semi-finals stage.
 The team finished the group stage with an unbeaten streak of 9 wins, with Josep Becerra as the tournament top scorer. After beating Metropolitan FA in the semifinals, Bayamón advanced to the finals facing GPS Puerto Rico. Bayamón won the tournament after a 1-0 win against GPS Puerto Rico.

In August 2018, it was announced that Bayamón FC will participate as one of the 10 teams of the new Liga Puerto Rico.

Competitions

Pre-season

2018 Bayamón Cup

FPF Preparatory Tournament

Friendlies

Liga Puerto Rico

Results

Standings

Copa Luis Villarejo

References

2018 in Puerto Rican football
2019 in Puerto Rican football
Bayamón FC